John Michael Austin  (14 March 193917 August 2007) was the Bishop of Aston from 1992 to 2005, filling a post which had been vacant since the previous incumbent Colin Buchanan resigned in 1989. After Austin the post again remained vacant for three years until the Diocese announced the appointment of Andrew Watson to fill the post In retirement, he served the Diocese of Leicester as stipendiary assistant bishop — called Assistant Bishop of Leicester — from 2005 until 2007.

Austin was educated at Worksop College and St Edmund Hall, Oxford (proceeding Oxford Master of Arts {MA(Oxon)}). He was ordained in 1965 and began his ordained ministry with a curacy at St John the Evangelist's East Dulwich.  He then held positions in Chicago and Walworth before becoming the Social Responsibility Adviser to the Diocese of St Albans. Appointed the Director of the London Diocesan Board for Social Responsibility in 1984, he was a committed campaigner for social justice.

References

Sources
Guardian obituary
Birmingham diocese obituary
Telegraph obituary

|-

1939 births
People educated at Worksop College
Alumni of St Edmund Hall, Oxford
20th-century Church of England bishops
21st-century Church of England bishops
Bishops of Aston
Assistant bishops of Leicester (1987–2017)
Officers of the Order of the British Empire
2007 deaths